Mayfest may refer to several annual events:

United Kingdom
 Mayfest (Bristol), a theatre festival in Bristol, England
 Mayfest, a festival held in Glasgow, Scotland 1983-1997
 Notting Hill Mayfest, hosted by St John's, Notting Hill, London, England

United States
 Fort Worth Mayfest, in Fort Worth, Texas
 Mayfest, in Perryville, Missouri
 Mayfest, in Tulsa, Oklahoma
 Mayfest, in Huntingdon, Pennsylvania

Other countries
 Maifest, a German spring celebration
 Mayfest, at Bilkent University, Ankara, Turkey